The Republic of South Africa is a unitary parliamentary democratic republic. The President of South Africa serves both as head of state and as head of government. The President is elected by the National Assembly (the lower house of the South African Parliament) and must retain the confidence of the Assembly in order to remain in office. South Africans also elect provincial legislatures which govern each of the country's nine provinces.

Since the end of apartheid in 1994 the African National Congress (ANC) has dominated South Africa's politics. The ANC is the ruling party in the national legislature, as well as in eight of the nine provinces (Western Cape is governed by the Democratic Alliance). The ANC received 57.50% of the vote during the 2019 general election. It had received 62.9%
of the popular vote in the 2011 municipal election. The main challenger to the ANC's rule is the Democratic Alliance, led by John Steenhuisen (previously by Mmusi Maimane), which received 20.77% of the vote in the 2019 election. Other major political parties represented in Parliament include the Economic Freedom Fighters and the Inkatha Freedom Party, which mainly represents Zulu voters. The formerly dominant New National Party, which both introduced and ended apartheid through its predecessor the National Party, disbanded in 2005 to merge with the ANC. Jacob Zuma served as President of South Africa since 9 May 2009 until his resignation in February 2018. Zuma was replaced by Cyril Ramaphosa. The country's 2019 general election was held on 8 May.

 Some argue that South Africa represents a dysfunctional state.

Context 

On 31 May 1910, the Cape Colony, Natal Colony, Transvaal and the Orange River Colony were united in one state called the Union of South Africa. The Union of South Africa adopted a system of governance based on the political system of the United Kingdom. The British monarch was the ceremonial head of state of South Africa and was represented by a Governor-General. Real political power lay in the hands of the Prime Minister and Cabinet. The basic ideas of this system such as a three branch government and strong Parliament remain in force today.

On 15 November 1926, the Balfour Declaration was adopted at the 1926 Imperial Conference. This document made the dominions of the British Empire including South Africa equal to each other and the United Kingdom. In practice, this made the Union of South Africa a self-governing dominion of the British Empire. The Union of South Africa became formally independent in 1931 when the Statute of Westminster was passed. It gave the Parliament of South Africa the power to make laws for South Africa without the approval of the Parliament of the United Kingdom.

In 1948, the National Party of South Africa adopted a policy of institutional racial segregation called apartheid. People of colour, especially the majority black population, were deprived of the few rights they had. Racial classification and discrimination was used to distribute economic resources and control political power. The white population, particularly the Afrikaners, controlled the political system. Black people were disenfranchised in all provinces of South Africa.

In 1961, South Africa became a Republic. The British monarch was replaced as head of state by a President elected by the minority of the population through elected representatives. In 1970, the Homeland Citizens Act was passed. It built on the system of reservations for the indigenous black African population to create a system of superficially independent black countries. Many Black people were deprived of their South African citizenship and instead became citizens of the Bantustan of their tribe. They were not recognized by a majority of the world's countries and the extent of their independent control over internal affairs was highly limited.

The African National Congress (ANC) led the fight against this system of apartheid. After intense international pressure and domestic struggle, the De Klerk government repealed or relaxed many apartheid laws. After negotiations between the ANC, Inkatha Freedom Party, NP and other organizations, apartheid was formally abolished and the Interim Constitution was passed. The Bantustans were abolished and reintegrated into South Africa and their citizens regained South African citizenship.
 
The Government of National Unity (GNU) established under the interim constitution ostensibly remained in effect until the 1999 national elections. The parties originally comprising the GNU – the African National Congress (ANC), the National Party (NP), and the Inkatha Freedom Party (IFP) – shared executive power. On 30 June 1996, the NP withdrew from the GNU to become part of the opposition.

Many of the principles of racial equality, majority democracy and minority rights that it established were translated into the final Constitution of South Africa that was adopted in 1996 and which remains in force. It sets out the structure of the government, protects fundamental human rights, creates mechanisms of accountability and divides legislative and executive power among the national, provincial and local spheres of government.

Government

South Africa is a parliamentary representative democratic republic, wherein the President of South Africa, elected by parliament, is the head of government, and of a multi-party system. It consists of three branches.

The executive branch consists of the President of South Africa and the Cabinet of South Africa. The President is elected by the Parliament of South Africa for a five-year term. The President may only serve two terms. By convention this position is occupied by the leader of the largest party in the National Assembly. The President appoints other members of the Cabinet called Ministers. Ministers oversee executive government departments. The Cabinet forms and executes policy and most legislative proposals originate from the Cabinet. The President and members of the Cabinet are accountable to the National Assembly. It has the power to remove them from office by passing a motion of no confidence and it has the power to hold them accountable through oral and written replies to questions from Members of Parliament.

The legislative branch consists of the Parliament. The Parliament consists of two chambers: the upper house is the National Council of Provinces (NCOP) and the lower house is the National Assembly. In practice, the National Assembly is by far the more powerful house. It controls the composition of the government and its approval is required for most legislative proposals to become law. The NCOP provides equal representation to South Africa's nine provinces and its approval is required for laws that affect South Africa's provinces and cultural communities. Whereas the National Assembly is elected by party proportional representation, the NCOP is elected by the legislatures of each province.

The judicial branch consists of the courts. It interprets and enforces laws. The highest court for constitutional matters is the Constitutional Court of South Africa. It has the power to strike down laws that conflict with the Constitution. The Supreme Court of Appeals is the highest court for non-constitutional matters. The High Court of South Africa is a court of general jurisdiction with appellate powers. It is divided into divisions that have authority over a geographic region of the country. Magistrate Courts serve as courts of first instance. There are specialized courts and tribunals with power that can be equivalent to the Supreme Court of Appeals.

Constitution

Following the 1994 elections, South Africa was governed under an interim constitution. This constitution required the Constituent Assembly (CA) to draft and approve a permanent constitution by 9 May 1996. The present constitution was passed in 1996 and promulgated by President Nelson Mandela in 1997. It is the highest law in the land; all other laws are expected to abide by and conform to the principles of the constitution. The Constitution not only sets out the structure of the three branches of government and the fundamental human rights of all of South Africa's people, but it provides for the management of public funding, the delineation of the boundaries and organization of Provinces, the formation of Chapter 9 Institutions to hold the government accountable.

Political parties and their current vote share

General elections take place every 5 years. The first fully non-racial democratic election was held in 1994, the second in 1999, the third in 2004, the fourth in 2009, the fifth in 2014, and the most recent in 2019. Until 2008, elected officials were allowed to change political party, while retaining their seats, during set windows which occurred twice each electoral term, due to controversial floor crossing legislative amendments made in 2002. The last two-floor crossing windows occurred in 2005 and in 2007.

After the 2009 elections, the ANC lost its two-thirds majority in the national legislature which had allowed it to unilaterally alter the constitution.

The Congress of South African Trade Unions (COSATU) and the South African Communist Party (SACP) are in a formal alliance with the ruling ANC (the so-called Tripartite Alliance), and thus do not stand separately for election.

Human rights

The constitution's bill of rights provides extensive guarantees, including equality before the law and prohibitions against discrimination; the right to life, privacy, property, and freedom and security of the person; prohibition against slavery and forced labour; and freedom of speech, religion, assembly, and association. The legal rights of criminal suspects also are enumerated. It also includes wide guarantees of access of food, water, education, health care, and social security. The constitution provides for an independent and impartial judiciary, and, in practice, these provisions are respected.

Citizens' entitlements to a safe environment, housing, education, and health care are included in the bill of rights, and are known as secondary constitutional rights. In 2003 the constitutional secondary rights were used by the HIV/AIDS activist group the Treatment Action Campaign as a means of forcing the government to change its health policy.

Violent crime, including violence against women and children, and organised criminal activity are at high levels and are a grave concern. Partly as a result, vigilante action and mob justice sometimes occur.

Some members of the police are accused of applying excessive force and abusing suspects in custody; as a result, the number of deaths in police custody remains a problem.  In April 1997, the government established an Independent Complaints Directorate to investigate deaths in police custody and deaths resulting from police action.

Some discrimination against women continues, although it has improved overall, and discrimination against those living with HIV/AIDS has been becoming a serious issue.

As of 2010, there has been a growing political intolerance and repression in regards to the persons in power.

Notable politicians
Many leaders of former bantustans or homelands have had a role in South African politics since their abolition.

Mangosuthu Buthelezi was chief minister of his Kwa-Zulu homeland from 1976 until 1994. In post-apartheid South Africa he has served as President of the Inkatha Freedom Party.
He was a Minister in President Mandela's cabinet. He also served as acting President of South Africa when President Nelson Mandela was overseas.

Bantubonke Holomisa, who was a general in the homeland of Transkei from 1987, has served as the president of the United Democratic Movement since 1997. Today he is a Member of Parliament.

General Constand Viljoen was a former chief of the South African Defence Force, who, as a leader of the Afrikaner Volksfront, sent 1500 of his militiamen to prop up the government of Lucas Mangope and to contest the termination of Bophuthatswana as a homeland in 1994.  He co-founded the Freedom Front in 1994. He retired from being a Member of Parliament before his death in 2020.

Lucas Mangope, former chief of the Motsweda Ba hurutshe-Boo-Manyane tribe of the Tswana, ex-president of the former bantustan of Bophuthatswana, was the leader of the United Christian Democratic Party.

References

Bibliography 
South Africa. The Constitution of the Republic of South Africa, 1996. Available at https://www.gov.za/documents/constitution-republic-south-africa-1996.
United Kingdom. South Africa Act, 1909. Available at https://media.law.wisc.edu/s/c_8/jzhy2/cbsa1.pdf
United Kingdom. Statute of Westminster, 1931. Available at https://www.legislation.gov.uk/ukpga/1931/4/pdfs/ukpga_19310004_en.pdf
United Kingdom. Balfour Declaration, 1926.
South Africa. Bantu Homeland Citizenship Act, 1970. Available at http://disa.ukzn.ac.za/leg19700309028020026
South Africa. Constitution of South Africa, Act 200 of 1993. Available at https://www.gov.za/documents/constitution/constitution-republic-south-africa-act-200-1993
South Africa. Status of the Union, Act 69 of 1934.

Further reading

External links
 Dynamics in the slow reform legislations
 Institute for Democracy